Bestall is an English surname. Notable people with this name include:

 John Bestall, Australian field hockey player
 Jackie Bestall, English footballer
 Alfred Bestall
 Leonard Delabere Bestall
 Maysie Bestall-Cohen

See also 
 Besta (disambiguation)

English-language surnames